Vishal Jethwa (born 6 July 1994) is an Indian television and film actor. He is known for portraying Akbar on Bharat Ka Veer Putra – Maharana Pratap which aired on Sony TV, and Sunny in the Bollywood film Mardaani 2.

Early life
Jethwa is a Gujarati. He was born to Naresh and Preeti Jethwa in 1994. He has an elder sister Dolly and younger brother Rahul. He completed his graduation from Thakur College of Science and Commerce.

Career
Vishal started his acting career in 2013 by landing a lead role of Akbar on Bharat Ka Veer Putra – Maharana Pratap. In 2015, he was roped in to play Bali in Sankatmochan Mahabali Hanuman. In 2016, he landed an important role of a terrorist on Diya Aur Baati Hum as Chota Packet. In the same year, he bagged the role of Nasir on Peshwa Bajirao. In August 2017, he replaced actor Bhavesh Balchandani to play the role of Lord Krishna on Chakradhari Ajaya Krishna. He also has appears in Colors TV's Thapki Pyar Ki as Prince and Ghatotkacha that will air on Life OK.

In his Bollywood debut, Jethwa was cast as the main antagonist in the 2019 film Mardaani 2. His performance was well received by the critics and the audience. In 2022, he was seen as Venky in Salaam Venky alongside Kajol.

Filmography

Films

Television

Music videos

Awards and nominations

References

External links 

 
 

1994 births
Living people
Gujarati people
Indian male television actors
Indian male soap opera actors
Male actors from Mumbai
Zee Cine Awards winners